İlyas Tüfekçi (born 3 February 1960 in Istanbul) is a retired football striker and later manager.

During his club career, Tüfekçi played in Germany and Turkey for Stuttgart, Schalke, Fenerbahçe, Galatasaray and Zeytinburnuspor.

External links
 
 

1960 births
Living people
Turkish footballers
Turkey international footballers
Turkish expatriate sportspeople in Germany
Expatriate footballers in Germany
Turkish expatriate footballers
Bundesliga players
Association football forwards
VfB Stuttgart players
FC Schalke 04 players
Galatasaray S.K. footballers
Fenerbahçe S.K. footballers
Turkish football managers
Kardemir Karabükspor managers
Zeytinburnuspor managers
Adana Demirspor managers
İzmirspor managers
Sakaryaspor managers
Sarıyer S.K. managers
Elazığspor managers
Sivasspor managers
Göztepe S.K. managers
Altay S.K. managers
Mersin İdman Yurdu managers
Beylerbeyi S.K. managers